An Ache in Every Stake is a 1941 short subject directed by Del Lord starring American slapstick comedy team The Three Stooges (Moe Howard, Larry Fine and Curly Howard). It is the 57th entry in the series released by Columbia Pictures starring the comedians, who released 190 shorts for the studio between 1934 and 1959.

Plot
The Stooges are icemen that have fallen asleep in their delivery wagon. Their horse wakes them up by bucking and sending Moe & Larry tumbling out of the back of the wagon. Curly finds his face and head embedded in a large block of ice after having used it for a pillow. Moe and Larry break him out of it, and they begin their ice block deliveries. After several deliveries they are called to make a delivery at a house atop a long, high staircase. It is so high that every time they go up, the ice melts to a small cube. They make several attempts including relaying it successfully to the top, only to have Curly drop it.  It is during these attempts and arguments that they twice bump into Mr. Lawrence (Vernon Dent) and ruin his cakes.

When the Stooges' antics cause the servants (Blanche Payson and Gino Corrado) at their customer's (Bess Flowers) house to quit, they volunteer to replace them and prepare dinner for her husband's birthday party. Unbeknownst to them, her husband is Mr. Lawrence, whose elaborate cakes they had wrecked earlier in the day.

While working in the kitchen, Larry tells Curly to shave some ice — which Curly does by placing a block of ice on a chair, slathering the bottom of the block with shaving cream, and using a straight razor to shave off the cream. Moe interrupts Curly and tells him to go back to stuffing the turkey, which Curly does by incorrectly following the stuffing directions. When dinner is served, one of the guests finds a ring and a wristwatch in her stuffing, believing it to be prizes. But the ring & watch turn out to belong to Curly, who lost them off his hand while stuffing the turkey. When the birthday cake they prepare is finished, it is accidentally pierced, and it deflates. The boys "re-inflate" the cake using town gas through the gas stove's connection.

During the party, the Stooges sing a "Happy Birthday" song to the tune of "London Bridge is Falling Down"; when Mr. Lawrence blows out the candles, the gas-filled cake explodes. Mr. Lawrence angrily realizes who the new servants are, and the Stooges are forced to leave in a hurry, riding a flat board down the stairs, and tumbling off near the bottom.

Notes
Although similar in appearance, the long staircase seen in the film is not the same one used in Laurel and Hardy's lost film Hats Off (1927) nor the Academy Award-winning film The Music Box (1932). The stairs — 147 steps in length — are approximately two miles northeast, located at Fair Oak View Terrace and Edendale Place in the Silver Lake district of Los Angeles. Unlike the stairs in The Music Box, this stairway begins from a cul-de-sac. Filming was completed March 26–29, 1941.

Curly's turkey-stuffing scene was performed earlier by Shemp Howard in the 1934 film A Peach of a Pair and again by Shemp in the Stooges' 1952 film Listen, Judge.

The plot device of carrying ice up a flight of stairs derives from the Billy Bevan silent film Ice Cold Cocos (1926), also directed by Del Lord. According to the SilentEra website, Ice Cold Cocos used the same staircase as Hats Off and The Music Box (located in the Silver Lake area of Los Angeles on Vendome (923-937 Vendome) at Del Monte.

This is one of several Stooge shorts in which a sofa spring becomes attached to someone's backside. This gag was also used in Hoi Polloi, Three Little Sew and Sews, Hugs and Mugs and Have Rocket, Will Travel. The film marked the final appearance of supporting actress Bess Flowers with the Stooges.

An Ache in Every Stake is considered a quintessential Three Stooges film. Ranking as a consistent fan favorite, a colorized version was released in 2004 as part of the DVD collection "Stooged & Confoosed."

References

External links 
 
 
 An Ache in Every Stake at threestooges.net

1941 films
Columbia Pictures short films
The Three Stooges films
American black-and-white films
Films directed by Del Lord
1941 comedy films
American slapstick comedy films
1940s English-language films
1940s American films